So Much for the City is the debut album of the Irish indie/pop band The Thrills. It was released in May 2003 and quickly became the number one in the Republic of Ireland, where it spent 61 weeks in the top 75, and also won 'Album of the Year' at the national music awards. It was also very successful in UK, debuting at #3, remaining in the charts for 25 weeks, and gave them some attention in Europe, with the single "Big Sur" reaching #17 in the UK, which remains as their highest charted position in that country to date.

In an interview, lead singer Conor Deasy explained the band's inspiration for the song material: 

The album was nominated for the 2003 Mercury Prize but lost to Dizzee Rascal's Boy in da Corner.

Legacy
The album was included in the book 1001 Albums You Must Hear Before You Die.

The song "Santa Cruz (You're Not That Far)" was ranked by Q Magazine at number 550 on their list of the 1001 best songs ever made.

The song "Say It Ain't So" appeared on US President George W. Bush's iPod in 2005.

Track listing
 "Santa Cruz (You're Not That Far)" – 4:13
 "Big Sur" – 3:07
 "Don't Steal Our Sun" – 2:50
 "Deckchairs and Cigarettes" – 4:58
 "One Horse Town" – 3:15
 "Old Friends, New Lovers" (feat. string arrangements by David Campbell) – 4:01
 "Say It Ain't So" – 2:44
 "Hollywood Kids" – 5:33
 "Just Travelling Through" – 3:21
 "Your Love Is Like Las Vegas" – 2:23
 "'Til the Tide Creeps In" / "Plans" (hidden track) – 10:06

Singles
 "Santa Cruz (You're Not That Far)" (November 11, 2002)
 "One Horse Town" (March 10, 2003)
 "Big Sur" (June 9, 2003)
 "Santa Cruz (You're Not That Far)" (re-issue) (August 25, 2003)
 "Don't Steal Our Sun" (November 24, 2003)

Charts

Weekly charts

Year-end charts

References

The Thrills albums
2003 debut albums
Albums produced by Tony Hoffer
Virgin Records albums
European Border Breakers Award-winning albums